Wolfeboro Falls is an unincorporated community in the town of Wolfeboro in Carroll County, New Hampshire, United States. The stream connecting the two lakes, known as the "Smith River", drops  over its  course.

New Hampshire Route 28 passes through the village, leading to Ossipee to the north and Alton to the south.  New Hampshire Route 109A leaves Route 28 at the center of the village, heading northwest towards Center Tuftonboro and Melvin Village.

Wolfeboro Falls has a ZIP code of 03896, different from the rest of the town of Wolfeboro.

References

Unincorporated communities in Carroll County, New Hampshire
Unincorporated communities in New Hampshire
Wolfeboro, New Hampshire